Ludovicus Jacobus Maria "Loek" van Mil (15 September 1984 – 28 July 2019) was a Dutch professional baseball pitcher. He played for Curaçao Neptunus of the Honkbal Hoofdklasse and for the Tohoku Rakuten Golden Eagles of the Nippon Professional Baseball (NPB). On the Netherlands national baseball team he served as the team's closer in the 2013 World Baseball Classic and the 2015 Premier 12 and appeared in the 2007 Baseball World Cup. He missed the 2008 Summer Olympics due to injury.

Early life
Mil competed in judo from ages 4 through 7. When his mother encouraged him to join a team sport, he chose to play baseball, as he had played a similar game in his elementary school.

He played as a catcher, until he became too tall to play the position and shifted to first base. At the age of 17, a coach decided to try Van Mil as a pitcher due to his strong throwing arm.

Career

Minnesota Twins
Van Mil signed a seven-year deal as a non-drafted free agent on 7 July 2005, with the Minnesota Twins. Van Mil threw  scoreless innings for HCAW in 2006, spending most of the year with the Gulf Coast League Twins of the Rookie-level Gulf Coast League.

Van Mil pitched for the Beloit Snappers of the Class A Midwest League during the 2008 season. He had a 2–2 record with 3 saves and a 3.22 ERA and 42 strikeouts in his first  innings, making the Midwest League All-Star game. Van Mil suffered a partially torn ulnar collateral ligament in his right arm while preparing for participation in the 2008 Summer Olympics, and missed the first seven weeks of the 2009 season while rehabilitating.

Van Mil began his 2009 season in late May with the Fort Myers Miracle, playing in the Class A-Advanced Florida State League. Later that year, he was promoted to the New Britain Rock Cats in the Class AA Eastern League. He finished the season with a 1–1 record and a 2.79 ERA in 42 games between the two clubs, 25 games out of the bullpen with Fort Myers with a 2.86 ERA and another 8 games with New Britain for a 2.45 ERA. On 20 November 2009, he was added to the Twins' 40 man roster.

Van Mil began the 2010 season with Fort Myers. He was designated for assignment to make room on the roster for Brian Fuentes on 27 August 2010.

Los Angeles Angels
Mil was announced as the player to be named later going to the Los Angeles Angels of Anaheim in the trade for Brian Fuentes on 1 September 2010.

With the Arkansas Travelers of the Class AA Texas League in 2011, Van Mil had a 3–5 record and 2.04 ERA in  innings across 30 games. He began the 2012 season with the Class AAA Salt Lake Bees, where he had a 1–0 record and 6.30 ERA.

Cleveland Indians
On 5 May 2012, the Angels traded Van Mil to the Cleveland Indians for future considerations. The Indians assigned him to the Akron Aeros of the Class AA Eastern League.

Rakuten Golden Eagles
Van Mil signed a one-year deal with the Rakuten Golden Eagles of Nippon Professional Baseball in early 2014. He spent most of the year with Rakuten's farm team.

Curaçao Neptunus
In March 2015 it was announced that van Mil would spend the year with Curaçao Neptunus Rotterdam of Honkbal Hoofdklasse. Van Mil was also named to Team Europe's roster for the 2015 Global Baseball Matchup against Samurai Japan.

Return to the Minnesota Twins
Van Mil pitched for the Minnesota Twins AAA affiliate, the Rochester Red Wings, on 2 September 2015, pitching 2 scoreless innings in relief in his first action stateside since 2013. On 10 April 2016, Van Mil in relief gave up four runs in 1.2 innings with a strikeout against Pawtucket, 4–9. With the loss, the Red Wings went to 4–8 on the season, the team losing six of their last eight games. They dropped to last place in the International League's Northern Division.

The 7-foot-1 Dutch native had allowed 15 runs (14 earned) in 5 1/3 innings over his first five appearances (including one start) with Triple-A Rochester. On 25 April 2016, he was released by the Minnesota Twins.

Australia
Van Mil played in the Australian Baseball League with the Adelaide Bite for the 2015–16 and 2017–18 seasons before signing with the Brisbane Bandits for the 2018-19 ABL season.

Dutch national team
Van Mil joined the Netherlands national baseball team for the first time for the 2007 Baseball World Cup.

He competed as part of the KNB team in the 2017 World Baseball Classic in March 2017. In what NBC reported was thought to be the tallest batter-pitcher matchup in baseball history, the  van Mil walked  Nate Freiman of Team Israel at the 2017 World Baseball Classic in a round one game.

Scouting report
Van Mil also threw a slider and a change-up.

He was one of the tallest players in the history of professional baseball, tied with former Minor League Baseball prospect Ryan Doherty.

Death
During a December 2018 series against the Canberra Cavalry, van Mil went bushwalking without his teammates near Canberra. During his hike, he slipped and hit his head on rocks. He was unconscious for about 24 hours before being woken up by kangaroos and attracted the attention of another hiker who drove him to a hospital. He was diagnosed with fourteen fractures, a ruptured eardrum and bleeding on the brain. He was cleared to return to baseball in January 2019 in time to help the Adelaide Bite win the 2019 Claxton Shield.

On 29 July 2019, the Royal Netherlands Baseball and Softball Federation announced van Mil had died. He had announced his retirement from baseball to focus on his recovery only a week earlier.

References

External links

Van Mil's profile at honkbalsite.com 
Loek van Mil, one of tallest baseball players ever at 7-foot-1, dies from 'fatal accident' (Loek van Mil Obituary at USA Today)

1984 births
2019 deaths
2013 World Baseball Classic players
2015 WBSC Premier12 players
2016 European Baseball Championship players
2017 World Baseball Classic players
Adelaide Bite players
Akron Aeros players
Arkansas Travelers players
Baseball players at the 2008 Summer Olympics
Beloit Snappers players
Brisbane Bandits players
Columbus Clippers players
Curacao Neptunus players
Deaths from head injury
Dutch expatriate baseball players in Japan
Dutch expatriate baseball players in the United States
Elizabethton Twins players
Fort Myers Miracle players
Gulf Coast Twins players
Louisville Bats players
Mr. Cocker HCAW players
Nippon Professional Baseball pitchers
New Britain Rock Cats players
Olympic baseball players of the Netherlands
Pensacola Blue Wahoos players
Sportspeople from Oss
Rochester Red Wings players
Salt Lake Bees players
Tohoku Rakuten Golden Eagles players
Dutch expatriate baseball players in Australia
Neurological disease deaths in the Australian Capital Territory
Accidental deaths from falls